Joo Don-sik (8 July 1937 – 2 August 2022) was a South Korean politician. An independent, he served as Minister of Culture and Sports from 1994 to 1995.

Joo died in Seoul on 2 August 2022, at the age of 85.

References

1937 births
2022 deaths
20th-century South Korean politicians
People from Cheonan
Independent politicians in South Korea
Government ministers of South Korea
Seoul National University alumni
Korea University alumni
Kyung Hee University alumni